This article lists political parties in the Netherlands, which has a multi-party system with numerous political parties, in which any one party has little chance of gaining power alone, and parties often work with each other to form coalition governments.

The lower house of the legislature, the House of Representatives, is elected by a national party-list system of proportional representation. There is no threshold for getting a seat, making it possible for a party to get a seat with only two-thirds percent of the vote—roughly one seat for every 67,000 votes.

No party has won a majority of seats since the election of 1894, and no party has even approached the seats needed for a majority since the current proportional representation system was implemented in 1918. All Dutch governments since then have been coalitions between two or more parties.  However, there is a broad consensus on the basic principles of the political system, and all parties must adjust their goals to some extent in order to have a realistic chance at being part of the government.

General overview

 The People's Party for Freedom and Democracy (VVD) is a conservative-liberal party. As a centre-right movement (''big market small government''), it attaches great importance to private enterprise, economic liberalism and the freedom of the individual in political, social, and economic affairs. The party is generally supportive of European economic integration, but is less supportive of political integration. The party's leader is Mark Rutte. VVD is a member of the Liberal International and the Alliance of Liberals and Democrats for Europe Party.
Democrats 66 (D66) have had widely fluctuating electoral fortunes since the party's founding in 1966. The party was founded as a movement that advocated direct democracy and electoral reform. Today, it is a centrist social liberal party, professing a pro-European platform and progressive views on, for example, euthanasia, organ donation, ecological sustainability and ethnic and religious tolerance. Sigrid Kaag leads the party. D66 is a member of the Liberal International and the Alliance of Liberals and Democrats for Europe Party.
The Party for Freedom (PVV) is a right-wing populist and national-liberal party. It was founded by Geert Wilders, who split from the VVD in 2004. The PVV seeks to lower taxation and limit immigration, especially from Islamic and non-Western countries. Supporting Nexit, it is hard Eurosceptic. The party is part of the Identity and Democracy group.
 The Christian Democratic Appeal (CDA) is a Christian democratic party on the centre to centre-right. It supports free enterprise and holds to the principle that government activity should supplement but not supplant communal action by citizens. On the political spectrum, the CDA sees its philosophy as standing between the "individualism" of the VVD and the "statism" of the Labour Party. The CDA favours European economic, cultural, and political integration. The CDA is a member of the Centrist Democrat International and the European People's Party.
 The Socialist Party (SP) is a left-wing populist party. The party itself has called its ideological shift a move "from socialism to a social-ism." The party opposes what it sees as the European Superstate. The SP operated as an independent party within the European United Left-Nordic Green Left group until the 2019 European elections, when it lost all seats in the European Parliament. Lilian Marijnissen is the leader of the SP.
The Labour Party (PvdA) is a social democratic party, and centre-left in orientation. Its program is based on more social, political, and economic equality for all citizens. Former PvdA Prime Minister Joop den Uyl has called it an "equal distribution of knowledge, income and power." Under Prime Minister Wim Kok, the PvdA espoused a centrist Third Way programme. The PvdA is generally supportive of European integration. Although called the Labour Party, it has no formal links to trade unions. In practice, however, strong links exist, with PvdA politicians often beginning their careers in the FNV trade union. The party is led by Lilianne Ploumen. The PvdA was a member of the Socialist International until it delisted in 2014. Nowadays, the party is a member of the Progressive Alliance and the Party of European Socialists.
 GreenLeft combines green politics with left-wing ideals. The party was founded in 1990 as a merger of the Radical, Pacifist, Communist, and Evangelical Left parties. The current leader Jesse Klaver opposes what he calls "economism", where important values seem to be secondary to economic growth. GreenLeft is a member of the Global Greens and the European Green Party.
 Party for the Animals (PvdD) is an animal rights party. It has been labeled as a one issue-party, though former PvdD leader Marianne Thieme has claimed it is not. The focus of the party is on animal welfare and environmental protection. The party also has distinctive points of view about education, privacy, health care and the economy. Its founder is Marianne Thieme. Its current leader is Esther Ouwehand. The party is currently part of the European United Left–Nordic Green Left group.
Forum for Democracy is a right-wing populist, and national conservative party. In favour of lower taxes, military investment and expansion, electoral reform, offering a referendum on European Union membership, reinstating border controls and ending what it perceives as mass immigration. The party was founded and is currently led by Thierry Baudet. The party is a member of the European Conservatives and Reformists Party and part of the ERC-group.
The Christian Union (CU) is a socially conservative Christian democratic party, which mostly concentrates on ethical issues, such as a resistance against abortion, euthanasia, and gay marriage. In other areas, such as immigration and the environment, the party often is closer to the progressive parties. It is a moderately Eurosceptic party. The CU operated within the European Conservatives and Reformists group, until after the 2019 European elections, when it joined the European People's Party group. The party is a founding member of the European Christian Political Movement.
 The Reformed Political Party (SGP) is a party of the Christian right, with stronger ethical points of view than the Christian Union. Although the party is small on a national level, having gained either two or three seats in every general election, it is an important political power in some orthodox reformed municipalities. The party sees governments (local, regional, national and international) as unconditional servants of God. The party bases all of its views directly on the Bible. Opposing European integration, the party is Eurosceptic, and operates within the European Conservatives and Reformists group and is a member of the European Christian Political Movement. Kees van der Staaij leads the SGP.
 DENK is a small political party mainly focusing on and promoting multiculturalism and social integration. The party also supports environmentalism and international justice. Tunahan Kuzu founded the party after splitting from the PvdA in 2014. The current leader is Farid Azarkan.
Volt Netherlands is the Dutch branch of the European federalist political movement Volt Europa. Its leader Laurens Dassen wants the EU to be a "strong parliamentary democracy" and proposes jointly tackling "cross-border issues", such as climate change.
JA21 is a conservative-liberal party founded by former Second Chamber member of the LPF Joost Eerdmans and senator Annabel Nanninga, following antisemitic text messages within Forum for Democracy in late 2020 . Joost Eerdmans wants to reintroduce the ideas from right-wing politician Pim Fortuyn into parliament, promoting more direct democracy, stricter immigration policies, and reforms on tax and wealth systems.
The Farmer–Citizen Movement (BBB) is a centre-right party that advocates for the interests of citizens working in the agrarian sector or living in rural areas. The party has profiled itself als a "more nuanced alternative" to lobby group Farmers Defence Force amidst farmer protests. The party's leader and only member of parliament is Caroline van der Plas.
BIJ1 is a political party that holds an intersectional perspective on socio-economic issues and claims to be made up of activists that have "joined forces to become political". The party strives to combat all forms of oppression and discrimination, including discrimination on the basis of "race, ethnicity, gender, sexual preference or anything else" and is explicitly anti-capitalist. The party's leader, Sylvana Simons, is the first black party leader in Dutch parliamentary history.

National political parties

Parties represented in the States General and/or European Parliament

Parties without representation in the States General and/or European Parliament

Regional and local political parties

European Netherlands

Regional parties

Local parties

Water board parties

Caribbean Netherlands

Bonaire

Saba

Sint Eustatius

Defunct political parties 

 General Elderly Alliance (AOV)
 General League of Roman Catholic Caucuses (succeeded by the Roman Catholic State Party)
 Alliantie voor Vernieuwing en Democratie (Alliance for Renewal and Democracy)
 Article 50 (merged with For the Netherlands)
 General Dutch Fascist League
 Anti-Revolutionary Party (ARP, 1879–1980; merged into Christian Democratic Appeal)
 Arab European League (AEL; initially founded in Belgium, active in the Netherlands between 2003 and 2005; now MDP)
 Workers Party of the Netherlands (APN)
 Farmers' Party (BP)
 League of Christian Socialists (BCS)
 League of Dutch Marxist–Leninists (BNML; merged into the Communist Workers Organisation (Marxist–Leninist))
 League of Free Liberals (merged into Liberal State Party)
 Brabant Party (active in North Brabant)
 Centre Democrats (CD; split from the Centre Party)
 Centre Party (CP; later Centre Party '86)
 Centre Party '86 (CP'86)
 Christian Democratic Party (CDP)
 Christian Democratic Union (CDU; merged into Labour Party)
 Christian Historical Union (CHU) (merged into Christian Democratic Appeal)
 Christian Social Party (CSP)
 Christian Historical Voters' League (CHK) (merged into the Christian Historical Party)
 Christian Historical Party (CHP) (merged into the Christian Historical Union)
 Christian Organisation of Self-employed Persons
 Communist Party of the Netherlands (CPN) (Communist Party Netherlands; merged into GroenLinks, some members formed the New Communist Party of the Netherlands)
 The Conservatives
 Continue Directe Democratie Partij (CDDP)
 Democratic Party (DP)
 Democratic Socialists '70 (DS'70)
 Sustainable Netherlands
 Economic League (EB)
 Entrepreneurs Party (OP)
 Europe Transparent (ET)
 Evangelical People's Party (EVP; merged into GroenLinks)
 Fatherland League
 Frisian League (merged into the Christian Historical Union)
 Reformed Political League (GPV; merged into Christian Union)
 Hervormd Gereformeerde Staatspartij (dissolved in 1946)
 Independent Socialist Party (OSP)
 Islam Democrats (ID)
 Islamic Party Netherlands (founded in 1998)
 Catholic National Party (KNP; merged into the Catholic People's Party)
 Catholic People's Party (KVP; merged into Christian Democratic Appeal)
 Communist Workers Organisation (Marxist–Leninist) (KAO(ml); dissolved around 1980)
 Communist Unity Movement of the Netherlands (Marxist–Leninist) (KEN(ml); dissolved in mid-1980s)
 Independent Citizens' Party (OBP)
 Livable Netherlands (LN)
 Liberal State Party (LSP; Liberal State Party; merged into Freedom Party (PvdV))
 Liberal Party (merged into the Fatherland League)
 Liberal Union (merged into Liberal State Party)
 Pim Fortuyn List (LPF) (disbanded in 2007)
 Ratelband List
 Veldhoen List
 Marxist–Leninist Party of the Netherlands (MLPN; a fake party founded in 1970 by the Dutch Intelligence Service BVD and the CIA, to research support for Maoism and to fool the People's Republic of China)
 Middle Party for City and Country (MPSL)
 Middle Class Party (MP)
 Muslim Party (founded in 1993)
 National Socialist Dutch Workers Party (NSNAP) (1931–1941)
 National Alliance (NA)
 Dutch Block (NB)
 New Middle Party (NMP)
 Neutral Party
 New National Party (NNP)
 New Right (NR)
 NIDA
 Nieuwe Wegen (NiWe, New Ways)
 O O Den Haag (O O The Hague; was initially registered for 2003 elections but withdrew)
 Pacifist Socialist Party (PSP; merged into GroenLinks)
 Party New Limburg (PNL; has been active in Limburg
 Party of the Future (PvdT)
 Party of Unity (PvdE)
 Freedom Party (PvdV) (succeeded by the People's Party for Freedom and Democracy)
 Partij Voor De Mens en alle overige aardbewoners
 Party for Justice, Action and Progress (PRDV)
 Peasants' League
 Political Party of Radicals (PPR; merged into GroenLinks)
 Progressive Integration Party
 Radical League (RB; merged into Free-thinking Democratic League)
 Reformatory Political Federation (RPF; merged into Christian Union)
 Roman Catholic Party of the Netherlands (RKPN)
 Roman Catholic State Party (RKSP; succeeded by the Catholic People's Party)
 Seniors 2000
 Solide Multiculturele Partij (SMP)
 Social Democratic Workers' Party (SDAP; merged into Labour Party)
 Social Democratic League (merged into the Social Democratic Workers' Party)
 'Social Liberal Party (SLP)
 Socialist Party (Socialist Party active before World War II, not the current Socialist Party)
 Solidarity '93 (appears not to have contested elections after 1998)
 Union 55+ (General Senior Union/Union 55+)
 Alliance for the Democratisation of the Army
 League of Communists in the Netherlands (VCN; split from the Communist Party of the Netherlands (CPN) in 1983 and merged with the remains of the CPN in 1992 to form the New Communist Party of the Netherlands (NCPN))
 Alliance for National Reconstruction
 ''VoorNederland (VNL)
 Free-thinking Democratic League (VDB; merged into Labour Party)
 Free Anti Revolutionary Party (merged into Christian Historical Party)

See also
 Politics of the Netherlands
 List of political parties by country
 Liberalism in the Netherlands
 Socialism in the Netherlands
 Christian democracy in the Netherlands
 Republicanism in the Netherlands

References

External links 
 Documentation Centre for Dutch Political Parties (DNPP) at University of Groningen

 
Netherlands
 
Netherlands politics-related lists
Netherlands